Samuel Adams (April 10, 1912 – June 5, 1942) was an officer in the United States Navy decorated for action in the Battle of Midway during World War II.

Biography
Born in Northampton, Massachusetts, Adams was appointed to the United States Naval Academy from the state's second Congressional district in 1931, and graduated in 1935 with an appointment to the rank of ensign. One of his classmates was Eugene B. Fluckey. Adams was assigned to sea duty on battleships, serving aboard  in June and July 1935 before being reassigned to  until January 2, 1938. He was then accepted to flight school at NAS Pensacola, where he earned wings as a naval aviator on January 17, 1939.

Soon promoted to Lieutenant (j.g.), Adams was assigned to aircraft carrier duty, first aboard  for one month (April–May 1939) and then with Bombing Squadron (VB) 5 aboard , from May 13, 1939 to the end of his career. While with Yorktown, Adams flew Northrop BT-1s, later transitioning with the rest of the squadron to the SBD Dauntless aircraft, flying escort for North Atlantic convoys until the U.S. entered the war. He was promoted to Lieutenant on October 1, 1941.

After the attack on Pearl Harbor, Yorktown was sent to the Pacific theater. Adams took part in raids in the Gilbert and Marshall Islands. He led raids on land and sea targets in and around Jaluit on February 1, 1942, against shipping off New Guinea on March 10, and on the island of Tulagi on May 4. He participated in the Battle of the Coral Sea on May 7 and 8. During this period Adams was twice awarded the Navy Cross.

The six Japanese aircraft carriers that had played a crucial role in the attack on Pearl Harbor became a primary focus of U.S. naval efforts in the ensuing Pacific campaign. Four of these ships were part of a battle group involved in the Battle of Midway; three were set ablaze in that battle on June 4, 1942. The fourth, the Hiryū, remained unscathed. At about 2:40 P.M. local time on June 5, Adams and his wingman, Lt. Harlan Dickson, spotted her and her battle group, consisting of two battleships, three heavy cruisers and four destroyers. Under fire from a Zero fighter, Adams radioed the ships' location (31°15' N., 179°05' W., moving north at approximately 20 knots). Because of this, the U.S. battle group was able to put the Hiryū out of action, and inflict major damage on the rest of the battle group.

On June 5, Adams spotted the Japanese destroyer Tanikaze and attacked; his plane disappeared in the clouds and was never seen again, presumed downed by anti-aircraft fire from the destroyer. Also killed in the attack was Adams's radioman Joseph Karrol.

Adams was posthumously awarded a third Navy Cross for the mission in which he located the Hiryū.

Namesake
The U.S. Navy destroyer , which saw duty in the latter part of World War II, was named in his honor and christened by his widow, Mrs. Maude Ryan Adams.

See also

List of people who disappeared mysteriously at sea

References

Attribution

External links

1912 births
1940s missing person cases
1942 deaths
Aerial disappearances of military personnel in action
Aviators killed in aviation accidents or incidents
Missing in action of World War II
People from Northampton, Massachusetts
People lost at sea
Recipients of the Navy Cross (United States)
United States Naval Academy alumni
United States Naval Aviators
United States Navy officers
United States Navy personnel killed in World War II
Military personnel from Massachusetts